St Margaret's Hospital may refer to:
St Margaret's Hospital, Auchterarder, Scotland
St Margaret's Hospital, Epping, England
St Margaret's Hospital, Sydney, Australia
UPMC St. Margaret, Aspinwall, Pennsylvania, United States